McGarr is a surname. Notable people with the surname include:

Chippy McGarr (1863-1904), baseball player
Ernie McGarr (born 1944), Scottish footballer
Frank James McGarr (born 1921), American judge
Lionel C. McGarr (1904-1988), United States Army lieutenant general
Peter McGarr (born 1953), English composer